The Southern class was a class of whale-catcher ships requisitioned from a commercial whaling company for service during the Second World War.  The whalers were converted for anti-submarine and minesweeping duties and were in use in the British Royal Navy and South African Navy. Six ships were built in Germany for the Southern Whaling Company and after the war, one was retained in the South African Navy, one had been sunk by a mine and four were sold back to commercial whaling companies.

History 
The six whale catchers were owned by Southern Whaling & Sealing Co. Ltd., London, United Kingdom and were used for whale catching in the Southern Ocean and Antarctic waters. The fleet of six ships was accompanied by the factory ship  in their annual whaling season sorties.  The fleet spent four seasons in the Antarctic before being requisitioned for naval service on their return to Cape Town after completion of the 1939-40 season.  The owners requested that all six ships were to be taken up into the Royal Navy, but only Southern Breeze was taken up for service in the UK, with the other five vessels being assigned to the South African Seaward Defence Force.

Ships of the Southern class 
All vessels listed based on this citation unless stated otherwise.  "AS Whaler" denotes anti-submarine equipped whaler.

Notes and references

Notes

Citations

Bibliography 

Ship classes of the Royal Navy
Minesweepers
Minesweepers of the Royal Navy
1939 ships
Research vessels of the United Kingdom
Whaling ships